Pasi Saarela (born August 24, 1973 in Finland) is a professional Finnish ice hockey player. Pasi Saarela won the Aarne Honkavaara trophy for best goal scorer in 2005 with the team, Lukko and in 1999 with Jokerit. He has won Sm-liiga championships with Jokerit in 1996 and 1997. He has also played in Switzerland's and Sweden's highest league levels. He now plays for Rauman Lukko.

Career statistics

Regular season and playoffs

International

References

External links
 

1973 births
Living people
People from Laitila
Finnish ice hockey right wingers
Frölunda HC players
Sportspeople from Southwest Finland